The 2017 Quetta church attack took place on 17 December 2017 when armed militants and suicide bombers stormed the Bethel Memorial Methodist Church in the western Pakistani city of Quetta, killing nine people and injuring dozens more. The attack was perpetrated by the Islamic State, who claimed responsibility through its Amaq media outlet.

Background

Christians make up less than two percent of Pakistan's population and are among the poorest and least influential group of Pakistani society. The community is regularly targeted by violence from religious extremists, notably the Peshawar church bombing in 2013 which saw more than 100 people killed, or the Lahore church bombings in 2015 which killed nineteen. Quetta, located in the restive southwestern Pakistani province of Balochistan is a majority Sunni region that has been a hotbed for much violence in the country. In November 2017, a Pakistani paramilitary convoy in Quetta was attacked by a suicide bomber, killing four.

Attack

On 17 December 2017 several hundred worshipers had gathered at the Bethel Memorial Methodist Church for Sunday service when a suicide bomber detonated his explosive vest at the entrance of the church hall. A second suicide bomber attempted to detonate his explosive vest however he was unable to and a gunfire broke out between him and security forces. The attacker was eventually killed, ending the assault which left nine people dead and scores more injured. Shortly after the attack, Amaq News Agency, the media arm of the Islamic State posted a statement on online claiming the attack had been carried out by the group.

See also
 2019 Ghotki riots
 2014 Larkana temple attack
 2009 Gojra riots

References

2017 murders in Pakistan
21st-century mass murder in Pakistan
December 2017 crimes in Asia
December 2017 events in Pakistan
ISIL terrorist incidents in Pakistan
Islamic terrorist incidents in 2017
Persecution by Muslims
Persecution of Christians in Pakistan
Terrorist incidents in Pakistan in 2017
Terrorist incidents in Quetta
Mass murder in 2017
Attacks on religious buildings and structures in Pakistan
Building bombings in Pakistan
Church bombings by Islamists